Prince Nikolay Pavlovich Shatilov (31 January 1849 – 1919) was a nobleman and general of the Russian Empire. He was the son of Pavel Nikolaevich Shatilov who also served as a commanding officer. Nikolay Shatilov was responsible for pacifying regional unrest in the Caucasus and initiating several judicial reforms. He also participated in the 1877 Russo-Turkish war and was decorated with several awards. After retiring from service, he went back to Tbilisi where he spent the last years of his life.

Awards

Three times Order of Saint Vladimir 2nd (1904), 3rd (1889) and 4th Grade (1877)
Two times Order of Saint Stanislaus first (1896) and second Grade (1883)
Two times Order of Saint Anna first (1900) and second Grade (1886)
Order of the White Eagle (1906)
Order of Saint Alexander Nevsky (1911), diamond stripes (1913)
Medal Nicholas II 300 years of the Romanov Dynasty (1913)

References

Imperial Russian Army generals
Georgian generals with the rank "General of the Infantry" (Imperial Russia)
Generals from Georgia (country)
Georgian generals in the Imperial Russian Army
19th-century people from Georgia (country)
1849 births
1919 deaths